Kashi was one of four s built for the Imperial Japanese Navy (IJN) during World War I. The ship was transferred to the Imperial Manchukuo Navy in 1937, but was returned to the IJN five years later.

Design and description
The Momo-class destroyers were enlarged and faster versions of the preceding  with a more powerful armament. The Momos were powered by two Brown-Curtis geared steam turbines, each driving one shaft using steam produced by four Kampon water-tube boilers. Two boilers burned a mixture of coal and fuel oil while the other pair only used oil. Their crew consisted of 110 officers and ratings.

The main armament of the Momo-class ships consisted of three quick-firing (QF)  guns; one gun each was located at the bow and stern with the third gun positioned between the funnels. Their torpedo armament consisted of two triple rotating mounts for  torpedoes located fore and aft of the funnels.

Construction and career
Kashi was launched on 1 December 1916 at the Sasebo Naval Arsenal and completed on 31 March 1917. The ship played a minor role in World War I and participated in the 1937 Battle of Shanghai that began the Second Sino-Japanese War.

Kashi was transferred to the Manchukuo Imperial Navy on 1 May 1937 and was renamed Hai Wei.

On 6 June 1942, Hai Wei was transferred back to the IJN, and reclassified as the auxiliary escort Kaii. The ship was sunk by United States Navy aircraft off Okinawa on 10 October 1944.

References

Bibliography

 

1916 ships
Ships built by Maizuru Naval Arsenal
Naval ships of Manchukuo
Momo-class destroyers
World War II destroyers of Japan
Destroyers sunk by aircraft
Ships sunk by US aircraft
World War II shipwrecks in the Pacific Ocean
Maritime incidents in October 1944